Lorne Clarke may refer to:
 Lorne Clarke (judge)
 Lorne Clarke (singer)